The Supreme Court of Greece can refer to any of the three Supreme Courts of Greece:

 Court of Cassation (established 1834), the supreme court of Greece for civil and criminal law
 Council of State (1835-1844; refounded 1928), the Supreme Administrative Court of Greece
 Chamber of Accounts (established 1833), a Supreme Administrative Court with a special jurisdiction

Judiciary of Greece